The 1973 USC Trojans football team represented the University of Southern California in the 1973 NCAA Division I football season.

Schedule

Personnel

Season summary

Arkansas

at Georgia Tech

Oklahoma

at Oregon State

Washington State

Oregon

at Notre Dame

at California

Stanford

at Washington

vs. UCLA

USC wins conference title and Rose Bowl berth
Anthony Davis 27 Rush, 145 Yds

Rose Bowl (vs Ohio State)

Statistics

Passing

Rushing

Receiving

Awards

References

USC
USC Trojans football seasons
Pac-12 Conference football champion seasons
USC Trojans football